Ruzaiq (also spelled Ruzayq) was an Iranian nobleman who lived during the 7th and 8th centuries. As the great-grandfather of Tahir ibn Husayn, he was the ancestor of the Tahirids.

Originally a Zoroastrian, he later converted to Islam and became the mawla of Talha ibn Abd Allah al-Khuza'i, an Arab nobleman from the Khuza'i tribe, who served as the governor of Sistan. Ruzaiq's son Mus'ab later played a prominent role in the Abbasid Revolution, and was later rewarded by the Abbasid caliphs by being appointed as the governor of Pushang and Herat. Ruzaiq probably died some years later.

Sources
 
 

Year of birth unknown
8th-century deaths
7th-century Iranian people
8th-century Iranian people
Converts to Islam from Zoroastrianism
Tahirid dynasty